The Jefferson Davis Carr House in Fort Pierre, South Dakota was built in 1906.  It was listed on the National Register of Historic Places in 1982.  It is: "A somewhat rare surviving domestic building constructed of locally manufactured materials, the Jefferson Davis Carr House is significant as a local architectural landmark and as an example of early settlement patterns in Stanley County."

References

Houses on the National Register of Historic Places in South Dakota
Italianate architecture in South Dakota
Colonial Revival architecture in South Dakota
Houses completed in 1906
Stanley County, South Dakota
1906 establishments in South Dakota